An urban township is a designation of a unit of local government in several countries.

United States
The term is called urban township Michigan, Minnesota and Ohio and urban town in Wisconsin. Generally, an urban township is afforded more local authority than that of a township and less than that of a city. Often, urban townships use this authority for greater economic development. (In Michigan, an urban township is different from a Charter township.) For more information on the specifics in each state, see the respective entries below:
 Urban township (Michigan)
 Urban township (Minnesota)
 Urban township (Ohio)
 Urban town (Wisconsin)

Taiwan
In Taiwan, the urban township is an administrative division of a county. Currently there are 38 urban townships in Taiwan. Those urban townships are:

 Beidou
 Beigang
 Budai
 Caotun
 Chaozhou

 Chenggong
 Dalin
 Donggang
 Dounan
 Erlin

 Fenglin
 Guanshan
 Guanxi
 Hemei
 Hengchun

 Houlong
 Huwei
 Jiji
 Jincheng
 Jinhu

 Jinsha
 Lukang
 Luodong
 Puli
 Su'ao

 Tianzhong
 Tongxiao
 Toucheng
 Tuku
 Xihu

 Xiluo
 Xinpu
 Yuanli
 Yuli
 Zhudong

 Zhuolan
 Zhunan
 Zhushan

See also
 Incorporated town

Townships in the United States
Townships